The St. Louis Cardinals 2002 season was the team's 121st season in St. Louis, Missouri and the 111th season in the National League.  The Cardinals went 97-65 during the season and won the National League Central division by 13 games over the Houston Astros.  In the playoffs, the Cardinals defeated the Arizona Diamondbacks 3 games to 0 in the NLDS but lost to the San Francisco Giants 4 games to 1 in the NLCS.

Second baseman Fernando Viña, shortstop Édgar Rentería, third baseman Scott Rolen, and outfielder Jim Edmonds each won Gold Gloves this year.

On June 18, long-time broadcaster Jack Buck died at the age of 77, while four days later, pitcher Darryl Kile was found dead in a Chicago hotel room, at age 33.

Offseason
 December 11, 2001:  Signed free agent pitcher Jason Isringhausen.

Regular season

Season standings

National League Central

Record vs. opponents

Game log

|- bgcolor=#cfc
| 1 || April 1 || Rockies || 10–2 || Morris || Hampton ||  || 48,397 || 1–0
|- bgcolor=#fbb
| 2 || April 3 || Rockies || 3–6 || Neagle || Stephenson || Jiménez || 26,557 || 1–1
|- bgcolor=#fbb
| 3 || April 4 || Rockies || 1–6 || Thomson || Benes ||  || 27,691 || 1–2
|- bgcolor=#cfc
| 4 || April 5 || @ Astros || 5–1 || Stechschulte || Mlicki ||  || 27,189 || 2–2
|- bgcolor=#cfc
| 5 || April 6 || @ Astros || 8–4 || Morris || Cruz ||  || 36,255 || 3–2
|- bgcolor=#fbb
| 6 || April 7 || @ Astros || 6–7 || Stone || Hackman ||  || 28,206 || 3–3
|- bgcolor=#cfc
| 7 || April 9 || Brewers || 6–5 || Veres || Cabrera || Isringhausen || 28,488 || 4–3
|- bgcolor=#cfc
| 8 || April 10 || Brewers || 6–5 || Isringhausen || Vizcaino ||  || 28,271 || 5–3
|- bgcolor=#cfc
| 9 || April 11 || Brewers || 6–5 || Veres || Cabrera || Kline || 28,165 || 6–3
|- bgcolor=#cfc
| 10 || April 12 || Astros || 7–3 || Morris || Miller ||  || 34,120 || 7–3
|- bgcolor=#cfc
| 11 || April 13 || Astros || 2–1 || Isringhausen || Stone ||  || 41,552 || 8–3
|- bgcolor=#fbb
| 12 || April 14 || Astros || 4–5 || Reynolds || Stephenson || Wagner || 38,609 || 8–4
|- bgcolor=#fbb
| 13 || April 15 || @ D'Backs || 5–14 || Helling || Benes ||  || 32,116 || 8–5
|- bgcolor=#fbb
| 14 || April 16 || @ D'Backs || 3–5 || Johnson || B. Smith || Myers || 37,505 || 8–6
|- bgcolor=#cfc
| 15 || April 17 || @ D'Backs || 8–4 || Morris || Schilling || Isringhausen || 35,147 || 9–6
|- bgcolor=#fbb
| 16 || April 18 || @ Brewers || 5–7 || Cabrera || Hackman || DeJean || 17,717 || 9–7
|- bgcolor=#fbb
| 17 || April 19 || @ Brewers || 1–6 || Quevedo || Timlin || Vizcaino || 23,865 || 9–8
|- bgcolor=#fbb
| 18 || April 20 || @ Brewers || 3–5 || Vizcaino || Veres || DeJean || 30,600 || 9–9
|- bgcolor=#fbb
| 19 || April 21 || @ Brewers || 3–5 || Neugebauer || B. Smith || DeJean || 24,592 || 9–10
|- bgcolor=#fbb
| 20 || April 23 || @ Mets || 3–4 || D'Amico || Morris || Benitez || 33,333 || 9–11
|- bgcolor=#cfc
| 21 || April 24 || @ Mets || 4–2 || Kile || Leiter || Isringhausen || 22,938 || 10–11
|- bgcolor=#fbb
| 22 || April 25 || @ Mets || 6–7 || Strickland || Veres || Benitez || 24,637 || 10–12
|- bgcolor=#cfc
| 23 || April 26 || @ Expos || 7–6 || Stechschulte || Ohka || Veres || 8,545 || 11–12
|- bgcolor=#cfc
| 24 || April 27 || @ Expos || 5–0 || Matthews || Chen ||  || 6,288 || 12–12
|- bgcolor=#fbb
| 25 || April 28 || @ Expos || 2–5 || Ohka || Morris || Herges || 9,780 || 12–13
|- bgcolor=#fbb
| 26 || April 30 || Marlins || 2–7 || Burnett || Kile ||  || 32,636 || 12–14
|-

|- bgcolor=#cfc
| 27 || May 1 || Marlins || 6–4 || T. Smith || Dempster || Isringhausen ||29,755 || 13–14
|- bgcolor=#fbb
| 28 || May 2 || Marlins || 6–9 || Tejera || Veres || Núñez || 36,132 || 13–15
|- bgcolor=#fbb
| 29 || May 3 || Braves || 2–11 || Hammond || Stechschulte || Smoltz || 40,758 || 13–16
|- bgcolor=#cfc
| 30 || May 4 || Braves || 3–2 || Simontacchi || Lopez || Isringhausen || 42,455 || 14–16
|- bgcolor=#fbb
| 31 || May 5 || Braves || 2–4 || Maddux || Kile || Smoltz ||39,509 || 14–17
|- bgcolor=#fbb
| 32 || May 6 || @ Cubs || 5–6 || Fassero || Timlin ||  || 35,083 || 14–18
|- bgcolor=#fbb
| 33 || May 7 || @ Cubs || 0–8 || Wood || B. Smith ||  || 35,748 || 14–19
|- bgcolor=#cfc
| 34 || May 8 || @ Cubs || 3–2 || Morris || Cruz || Isringhausen || 33,473 || 15–19
|- bgcolor=#cfc
| 35 || May 10 || @ Reds || 4–2 || Stechschulte || White || Isringhausen || 29,008 || 16–19
|- bgcolor=#fbb
| 36 || May 11 || @ Reds || 1–8 || Reitsma || Kile ||  || 25,006 || 16–20
|- bgcolor=#cfc
| 37 || May 12 || @ Reds || 10–8 || Stechschulte|| Graves || Isringhausen || 20,622 || 17–20
|- bgcolor=#cfc
| 38 ||May 13 || Cubs || 3–0 || Morris || Wood ||  || 45,720 || 18–20
|- bgcolor=#cfc
| 39 || May 14 || Cubs || 11–2 || Timlin || Cruz ||  || 47,035 || 19–20
|- bgcolor=#cfc
|40 || May 15 || Cubs || 4–1 || Stechschulte || Bere || Isringhausen || 40,719 || 20–20
|- bgcolor=#cfc
| 41 || May 17 || Reds || 3–1 || Kile || Sullivan || Isringhausen|| 36,103 || 21–20
|- bgcolor=#fbb
| 42 || May 18 || Reds || 3–7 || Rijo || Morris ||  || 40,483 || 21–21
|- bgcolor=#cfc
| 43 || May 19 || Reds || 10–1 || Stephenson || Acevedo ||  || 42,992 || 22–21
|- bgcolor=#cfc
| 44 || May 20 || Reds || 7–3 || Williams || Haynes ||  || 35,560 || 23–21
|- bgcolor=#cfc
| 45 || May 21 || Astros || 3–1 || Simontacchi || Hernandez || Isringhausen || 33,442 || 24–21
|- bgcolor=#cfc
| 46 || May 22 || Astros || 3–2 || Veres || Stone ||  || 32,481 || 25–21
|- bgcolor=#cfc
| 47 || May 23 || Astros || 5–4 || Hackman || Dotel || Isringhausen || 38,772 || 26–21
|- bgcolor=#fbb
| 48 || May 24 || @ Pirates || 2–5 || Wells || Stephenson ||  || 25,203 || 26–22
|- bgcolor=#cfc
| 49 || May 25 || @ Pirates || 6–3 || Williams || Anderson || Isringhausen || 26,201 || 27–22
|- bgcolor=#cfc
| 50 || May 26 || @ Pirates || 7–3 || Simontacchi || Fogg ||  || 31,989 || 28–22
|- bgcolor=#cfc
| 51 || May 27 || @ Astros || 4–3 || Stechschulte || Oswalt || Isringhausen || 30,543 || 29–22
|- bgcolor=#cfc
| 52 || May 28 || @ Astros || 4–1 || Morris || Reynolds || Isringhausen || 25,376 || 30–22
|- bgcolor=#fbb
| 53 || May 29 || @ Astros || 5–10 || Redding || Stephenson ||  || 27,182 || 30–23
|- bgcolor=#fbb
| 54 || May 31 || Pirates || 1–3 || Fogg || W. Williams || M. Williams || 38,148 || 30–24
|-

|- bgcolor=#cfc
| 55 || June 1 || Pirates || 9–4 || Kile || Arroyo ||  || 43,295 || 31–24
|- bgcolor=#fbb
| 56 || June 2 || Pirates || 2–5 || Lowe || Morris || M. Williams || 37,243 || 31–25
|- bgcolor=#cfc
| 57 || June 4 || @ Reds || 8–5 || Simontacchi || Hamilton ||  || 19,189 || 32–25
|- bgcolor=#bbb
|   || June 5 || @ Reds || colspan=6 |Postponed (Rain) Makeup date: August 27
|- bgcolor=#fbb
| 58 || June 6 || @ Reds || 2–3 || Haynes || Williams || Graves || 23,102 || 32–26
|- bgcolor=#cfc
| 59 || June 7 || @ Royals || 12–6|| Kile || Byrd ||  || 34,194 || 33–26
|- bgcolor=#cfc
| 60 || June 8 || @ Royals || 11–3 || Morris || Affeldt ||  || 40,016 || 34–26
|- bgcolor=#fbb
| 61 || June 9 || @ Royals || 2–3 || Ro. Hernandez || Timlin ||  || 26,905 || 34–27
|- bgcolor=#fbb
| 62 || June 10 || @ Mariners || 0–10 || Moyer || B. Smith ||  || 45,699 || 34–28
|- bgcolor=#cfc
| 63 || June 11 || @ Mariners || 7–4 || Williams || Baldwin ||  || 44,983 || 35–28
|- bgcolor=#fbb
| 64 || June 12 || @ Mariners || 0–5 || Piñeiro || Kile ||  || 45,612 || 35–29
|- bgcolor=#cfc
| 65 || June 14 || Royals || 3–0 || Morris || Asencio || Kline || 40,510 || 36–29
|- bgcolor=#cfc
| 66 || June 15 || Royals || 5–3 || Simontacchi || Suppan || Veres || 47,453 || 37–29
|- bgcolor=#cfc
| 67 || June 16 || Royals || 5–1 || Williams || May ||  || 47,522 || 38–29
|- bgcolor=#cfc
| 68 || June 18 || Angels || 7–2 || Kile || Appier ||  || 39,386 || 39–29
|- bgcolor=#cfc
| 69 || June 19 || Angels || 6–2 || Morris || Sele ||  || 35,432 || 40–29
|- bgcolor=#fbb
| 70 || June 20 || Angels || 2–3 || Schoeneweis || B. Smith || Percival || 36,385 || 40–30
|- bgcolor=#fbb
| 71 || June 21 || @ Cubs || 1–2 || Lieber || Williams ||  || 38,486 || 40–31
|- bgcolor=#bbb
|   || June 22 || @ Cubs || colspan=6 |Postponed (death of P Darryl Kile) Makeup date: August 31
|- bgcolor=#fbb
| 72 || June 23 || @ Cubs || 3–8 || Wood || Simontacchi ||  || 37,647 || 40–32
|- bgcolor=#fbb
| 73 || June 25 || Brewers || 0–2 || Rusch || Morris ||  || 33,074 || 40–33
|- bgcolor=#cfc
| 74 || June 26 || Brewers || 5–2 || Williams || Wright || Isringhausen || 32,686 || 41–33
|- bgcolor=#fbb
| 75 || June 27 || Brewers || 2–7 || Vizcaino || Stechschulte ||  || 31,136 || 41–34
|- bgcolor=#cfc
| 76 || June 28 || Reds || 3–2 || Simontacchi || Reitsma || Isringhausen || 38,564 || 42–34
|- bgcolor=#fbb
| 77 || June 29 || Reds || 2–4 || Dessens || Hackman || Graves || 46,272 || 42–35
|- bgcolor=#fbb
| 78 || June 30 || Reds || 8–12 || Sullivan || Isringhausen ||  || 39,861 || 42–36
|-

|- bgcolor=#cfc
| 79 || July 1 || Padres || 7–3 || Williams || Pérez ||  || 30,113 || 43–36
|- bgcolor=#cfc
| 80 || July 2 || Padres || 11–5 || Crudale || Jarvis ||  ||29,622 || 44–36
|- bgcolor=#cfc
| 81 || July 3 || Padres || 4–1 ||Simontacchi || Lawrence || Isringhausen || 41,533 ||45–36
|- bgcolor=#cfc
| 82 || July 4 || Dodgers || 3–2 || T. Smith || Ishii || Isringhausen || 39,421 || 46–36
|- bgcolor=#fbb
| 83 || July 5 || Dodgers || 5–6 || Pérez || Morris || Gagné || 41,447 ||46–37
|- bgcolor=#fbb
| 84 || July 6 || Dodgers || 2–4 || Quantrill || Kline || Gagné || 42,825 || 46–38
|- bgcolor=#cfc
| 85 || July 7 || Dodgers || 12–6 || Matthews || Daal ||  || 33,777 || 47–38
|- bgcolor=#fbb
| 86 || July 12	|| @ Padres || 3–4 || Holtz || Veres || Hoffman || 23,794 || 47–39
|- bgcolor=#cfc
| 87 || July 13	|| @ Padres || 2–1 || Crudale || Reed || Isringhausen || 48,963 || 48–39
|- bgcolor=#cfc
| 88 || July 14	|| @ Padres || 4–1 || B. Smith || B. J. Jones || Isringhausen || 24,045 || 49–39
|- bgcolor=#cfc
| 89 || July 15 || @ Dodgers || 4–2 || T. Smith || Daal || Isringhausen || 31,899 || 50–39
|- bgcolor=#cfc
| 90 || July 16 || @ Dodgers || 9–2 || Hackman || Nomo ||  || 37,988 ||51–39
|- bgcolor=#fbb
| 91 || July 17 || @ Giants || 4–5 || Worrell || Veres || Nen || 44,355 || 51–40
|- bgcolor=#cfc
| 92 || July 18 || @ Giants || 5–1 || Morris || Schmidt ||  || 44,118 || 52–40
|- bgcolor=#fbb
| 93 || July 19 || @ Pirates || 9–12 || Sauerbeck || Veres ||  || 23,812 || 52–41
|- bgcolor=#fbb
| 94 || July 20 || @ Pirates || 6–15 || Benson || T. Smith ||  || 35,101 || 52–42
|- bgcolor=#cfc
| 95 || July 21 || @ Pirates || 8–4 || Finley || Fogg || Kline || 27,999 || 53–42
|- bgcolor=#cfc
| 96 || July 22 || @ Giants || 5–3 || Hackman || Worrell || Isringhausen || 40,607 || 54–42
|- bgcolor=#cfc
| 97 || July 23 || @ Giants || 4–0 || Morris || Schmidt ||  || 40,453 || 55–42
|- bgcolor=#fbb
| 98 || July 24 || @ Giants || 4–6 || Rueter || Benes || Nen || 41,005 || 55–43
|- bgcolor=#cfc
| 99 || July 25 || @ Giants || 4–3 || T. Smith || Jensen || Isringhausen || 41,503|| 56–43
|- bgcolor=#cfc
| 100 || July 26 || Cubs || 8–4 || Finley || Lieber ||  || 48,730 || 57–43
|- bgcolor=#fbb
| 101 || July 27 || Cubs || 3–7 || Wood || Simontacchi ||  || 47,110 || 57–44
|- bgcolor=#cfc
| 102 || July 28 || Cubs || 10–9 || Veres || Alfonseca ||  || 47,583 || 58–44
|- bgcolor=#cfc
| 103 || July 30 || @ Marlins || 5–0 || Benes || Tejera ||  || 8,187 || 59–44
|- bgcolor=#fbb
| 104 || July 31 || @ Marlins || 5–8 || Beckett || T. Smith || Looper || 7,587 || 59–45
|-

|- bgcolor=#fbb
| 105 || August 1 || @ Marlins || 0–4 || Burnett || Finley ||  || 7,346 || 59–46
|- bgcolor=#fbb
| 106 || August 2 || @ Braves || 5–11 || Glavine || Simontacchi ||  || 45,512 || 59–47
|- bgcolor=#fbb
| 107 || August 3 || @ Braves || 1–6 || Marquis || Morris ||  || 46,356 || 59–48
|- bgcolor=#fbb
| 108 || August 4 || @ Braves || 1–2 || Smoltz || Veres ||  || 33,686 || 59–49
|- bgcolor=#fbb
| 109 || August 6 || Expos || 1–10 || Yoshii || Finley ||  || 34,126 || 59–50
|- bgcolor=#fbb
| 110 || August 7 || Expos || 1–4 || Ohka || Simontacchi || Stewart || 33,179 || 59–51
|- bgcolor=#cfc
| 111 || August 8 || Expos || 5–3 || Morris || Reames || Isringhausen || 33,403 || 60–51
|- bgcolor=#fbb
| 112 || August 9 || Mets || 1–2 || Leiter || Matthews || Benitez || 44,299 || 60–52
|- bgcolor=#cfc
| 113 || August 10 || Mets || 5–4 || Veres || Reed || Isringhausen || 44,934 || 61–52
|- bgcolor=#cfc
|114 || August 11 || Mets || 9–0 || Finley || Astacio ||  || 36,896 || 62–52
|- bgcolor=#cfc
| 115 || August 12 || @ Pirates || 10–6 || Simontacchi || Meadows ||  || 15,700 || 63–52
|- bgcolor=#cfc
| 116 || August 13 || @ Pirates || 9–5 || Morris || Anderson || Isringhausen || 17,609 || 64–52
|- bgcolor=#cfc
| 117 || August 14 || @ Pirates || 7–3 || Benes || Wells ||  || 18,791 || 65–52
|- bgcolor=#cfc
| 118 || August 15 || @ Pirates || 11–5 || Kline || M. Williams ||  || 20,503 || 66–52
|- bgcolor=#fbb
| 119 || August 16 || @ Phillies || 0–4 || Wolf || Finley ||  || 31,117 || 66–53
|- bgcolor=#cfc
| 120 || August 17 || @ Phillies || 5–1 || Simontacchi || Coggin ||  || 20,242 || 67–53
|- bgcolor=#cfc
| 121 || August 18 || @ Phillies || 5–1 || Morris || Padilla ||  || 58,493 || 68–53
|- bgcolor=#cfc
| 122 || August 19 || Pirates || 7–2 || Benes || Wells ||  || 31,626 || 69–53
|- bgcolor=#fbb
| 123 || August 20 || Pirates || 0–8 || Benson || Hackman ||  || 34,997 || 69–54
|- bgcolor=#cfc
| 124 || August 21 || Pirates || 4–1 || Finley || Fogg || Isringhausen || 26,806 || 70–54
|- bgcolor=#cfc
| 125 || August 22 || Pirates || 5–4 || Molina || M. Williams ||  || 26,606 || 71–54
|- bgcolor=#fbb
| 126 || August 23 || Phillies || 4–5 || Adams || Joseph ||  || 35,724 || 71–55
|- bgcolor=#fbb
| 127 || August 24 || Phillies || 0–4 || Padilla || Benes || Mesa || 41,033 || 71–56
|- bgcolor=#fbb
| 128 || August 25 || Phillies || 3–5 || Silva || Isringhausen || Mesa || 31,850 || 71–57
|- bgcolor=#fbb
| 129 || August 27 (1) || @ Reds || 4–5 || Reitsma || Simontacchi || Graves ||  || 71–58
|- bgcolor=#cfc
| 130 || August 27 (2) || @ Reds || 5–0 || Finley || Dessens ||  || 19,570 || 72–58
|- bgcolor=#cfc
| 131 || August 28 || @ Reds || 9–2 || Kline || Estes ||  || 17,544 || 73–58
|- bgcolor=#fbb
| 132 || August 29 || @ Reds || 0–7 || Haynes || Williams ||  || 20,503 || 73–59
|- bgcolor=#cfc
| 133 || August 30 || @ Cubs || 6–3 || Wright || Zambrano || Veres || 36,311 || 74–59
|- bgcolor=#cfc
| 134 || August 31 (1) || @ Cubs || 8–1 || Hackman || Prior ||  || 37,874 || 75–59
|- bgcolor=#cfc
| 135 || August 31 (2) || @ Cubs || 10–4 || Benes || Bere ||  || 37,639 || 76–59
|-

|- bgcolor=#fbb
| 136 || September 1 || @ Cubs || 4–5 || Cruz || Finley || Alfonseca || 37,739 || 76–60
|- bgcolor=#fbb
| 137 || September 2 || Reds || 3–5 || Estes || Stephenson || Graves || 37,064 || 76–61
|- bgcolor=#cfc
| 138 || September 3 || Reds || 3–1 || Williams || Haynes || Veres || 26,641 || 77–61
|- bgcolor=#cfc
| 139 || September 4 || Reds || 10–5 || Hackman || Chen ||  || 25,363 || 78–61
|- bgcolor=#cfc
| 140 || September 6 || Cubs || 11–2 || Andy Benes || Alan Benes ||  || 38,661 || 79–61
|- bgcolor=#cfc
| 141 || September 7 || Cubs || 6–5 || Fassero || Alfonseca ||  || 46,779 || 80–61
|- bgcolor=#cfc
| 142 || September 8 || Cubs || 3–1 || Simontacchi || Wood || Kline || 45,265 || 81–61
|- bgcolor=#cfc
| 143 || September 9 || @ Brewers || 3–0 || Williams || Diggins || Kline || 16,351 || 82–61
|- bgcolor=#cfc
| 144 || September 10 || @ Brewers || 8–3 || Morris || Franklin ||  || 17,539 || 83–61
|- bgcolor=#cfc
| 145 || September 11 || @ Brewers || 4–3 || Fassero || Sheets || Isringhausen || 16,907 || 84–61
|- bgcolor=#fbb
| 146 || September 12 || @ Astros || 3–6 || Dotel || Veres || Wagner || 26,365 || 84–62
|- bgcolor=#cfc
| 147 || September 13 || @ Astros || 3–2 || White || Gordon || Isringhausen || 33,672 || 85–62
|- bgcolor=#cfc
| 148 || September 14 || @ Astros || 2–1 || Williams || Munro || Isringhausen || 39,333 || 86–62
|- bgcolor=#fbb
| 149 || September 15 || @ Astros || 0–8 || Miller || Morris ||  || 32,456 || 86–63
|- bgcolor=#cfc
| 150 || September 17 || @ Rockies || 11–4 || Fassero || Mercker ||  || 25,833 || 87–63
|- bgcolor=#cfc
| 151 || September 18 || @ Rockies || 8–5 || White || Speier || Kline || 25,330 || 88–63
|- bgcolor=#cfc
| 152 || September 19 || @ Rockies || 12–6 || Simontacchi || Jennings ||  || 25,567 || 89–63
|- bgcolor=#cfc
| 153 || September 20 || Astros || 9–3 || White || Munro ||  || 34,990 || 90–63
|- bgcolor=#fbb
| 154 || September 21 || Astros || 3–6 || Miller || Morris ||  || 40,365 || 90–64
|- bgcolor=#cfc
| 155 || September 22 || Astros || 7–3 || Finley || Saarloos ||  || 38,706 || 91–64
|- bgcolor=#cfc
| 156 || September 23 || D'Backs || 13–1 || Wright || Helling ||  || 30,568 || 92–64
|- bgcolor=#cfc
| 157 || September 24 || D'Backs || 3–2 || Isringhausen || Fetters ||  || 30,019 || 93–64
|- bgcolor=#cfc
| 158 || September 25 || D'Backs || 6–1 || Stephenson || Schilling ||  || 32,212 || 94–64
|- bgcolor=#cfc
| 159 || September 26 || Brewers || 9–1 || Morris || Diggins ||  || 27,299 || 95–64
|- bgcolor=#fbb
| 160 || September 27 || Brewers || 1–2 || Sheets || White || DeJean || 32,186 || 95–65
|- bgcolor=#cfc
| 161 || September 28 || Brewers || 3–1 || Finley || Rusch || Isringhausen || 35,906 || 96–65
|- bgcolor=#cfc
| 162 || September 29 || Brewers || 4–0 || Crudale || Vizcaino ||  || 40,250 || 97–65
|-

Transactions
 June 9: Released pitcher José Rodríguez.
 July 29: Traded third baseman Plácido Polanco, pitcher Mike Timlin, and pitcher Bud Smith to the Philadelphia Phillies for third baseman Scott Rolen, Doug Nickle and cash.

Roster

Player stats

Batting

Starters by position
Note: Pos = Position; G = Games played; AB = At bats; H = Hits; Avg. = Batting average; HR = Home runs; RBI = Runs batted in

Other batters
Note: G = Games played; AB = At bats; H = Hits; Avg. = Batting average; HR = Home runs; RBI = Runs batted in

Pitching

Starting pitchers
Note: G = Games; IP = Innings pitched; W = Wins; L = Losses; ERA = Earned run average; SO = Strikeouts

Other pitchers
Note: G = Games pitched; IP = Innings pitched; W = Wins; L = Losses; ERA = Earned run average; SO = Strikeouts

Relief pitchers
Note: G = Games; W = Wins; L = Losses; SV = Saves; ERA = Earned run average; SO = Strikeouts

NLDS

St. Louis wins the series, 3-0

NLCS

Game 1
October 9: Busch Stadium, St. Louis, Missouri

Game 2
October 10: Busch Stadium, St. Louis, Missouri

Game 3
October 12: Pac Bell Park, San Francisco

Game 4
October 13: Pac Bell Park, San Francisco

Game 5
October 14: Pac Bell Park, San Francisco

Farm system

References

External links

2002 St. Louis Cardinals at Baseball Reference
2002 St. Louis Cardinals team page at www.baseball-almanac.com

St. Louis Cardinals seasons
National League Central champion seasons
St Louis